The 82nd District of the Iowa House of Representatives in the state of Iowa.

Current elected officials
Bobby Kaufmann is the representative currently representing the district.

Past representatives
The district has previously been represented by:
Lillian McElroy, 1971–1973
 Thomas Higgins, 1973–1977
 Robert Arnould, 1977–1983
 Dorothy Carpenter, 1983–1993
 Joan Hester, 1993–1995
 Donna Barry, 1995–2001
 Paul Wilderdyke, 2001–2003
 Joe Hutter, 2003–2007
 Linda Miller, 2007–2013
 Curt Hanson, 2013–2017
 Phil Miller, 2017–2019
 Jeff Shipley, 2019–2023
 Bobby Kaufmann, 2023–present

References

082